The little thornbird (Phacellodomus sibilatrix) is a species of bird in the family Furnariidae. It is found in Argentina, Bolivia, Paraguay, and Uruguay. Its natural habitats are subtropical or tropical dry forest and subtropical or tropical dry shrubland.

References

Further reading

little thornbird
Birds of the Gran Chaco
little thornbird
little thornbird
Taxonomy articles created by Polbot